The Blue Snowman is a fictional character appearing in DC Comics publications and related media, commonly as a recurring adversary of the superhero Wonder Woman. Created by writer William Moulton Marston and artist Harry G. Peter, the character debuted in 1946 in Sensation Comics #59 as a high-tech extortionist named Byrna Brilyant who used a fearsome costumed persona (known then only as the Snow Man) to coerce money out of innocent victims. Brilyant's Golden Age gender identity was presented as that of a woman who disguised herself as an ostensibly male supervillain to deflect criminal suspicion – a genderplay trope Marston incorporated into several other foes he created to battle Wonder Woman, including Doctor Poison and Hypnota. Since 2021, the Modern Age Byrna Brilyant has been written as genderfluid, their Blue Snowman stylings part of their flexible nonbinary gender-presentation. 

In their first appearance in 1946, Brilyant's alter ego dressed in a bulky blue robe, complete with jowlish blue head mask and blue derby. A later appearance in 1948 (in Wonder Woman #28) changed their name from the Snow Man to the Blue Snowman, keeping the head mask and hat, but replacing the robe with a bulbous metallic bodysuit, similar in silhouette to that of the advertising mascot the Michelin Man. The Golden Age Blue Snowman's primary weapon was a giant canon which could fire a "snow ray" producing "blue snow," a form of precipitation freezing anything it touches. The Modern Age Blue Snowman not only continues to sport a derby, but also wears an advanced exo-suit of blue mecha-style armor fashioned to look like the round features of a children's snowman. This armor is outfitted with weaponry capable of firing a cryogenic blast that can freeze anything in its path, similar to the ice guns wielded by fellow DC Comics rogues Mr. Freeze and Captain Cold.

Publication history
Blue Snowman first appeared in Sensation Comics #59 and was created by William Moulton Marston and H.G. Peter.

Fictional character biography

Earth-Two version
Byrna Brilyant's scientist father died while working on his invention of "blue snow", a special form of precipitation that freezes everything it touches. This invention was intended to "serve humanity", although precisely how seems rather vague. Thinking to put their father's work to more profitable use, Byrna creates the masculine identity of the Snow Man and unleashes the petrifying power of blue snow upon the farming community of Fair Weather Valley, demanding each farmer's "life savings" in return for the chemical antidote that will free crops, livestock, and people from the snow's effects. The Blue Snow Man is discovered in "his" mountain sanctuary by Wonder Woman, who forces "him" to defrost the valley.

Like many of Wonder Woman's enemies, Brilyant is sentenced to prison on the Amazon penal colony Transformation Island, but in 1948 they and seven female super-villains escape and pool their talents as Villainy Inc. Led by the Saturnian slaver Eviless, the evil eight are again defeated by Wonder Woman. In this appearance, they call themself the Blue Snow Man.

Byrna retained their male appearance and name in this second appearance, but what, if anything, is to be made of their choice of criminal identities is unknown.

Post-Crisis
After all of the Golden Age Wonder Woman stories were erased from history by the Crisis on Infinite Earths crossover, Blue Snowman fell into obscurity for many years. Sometime later, the Blue Snowman reappeared as they are pursued and defeated by Power Girl and Doctor Mid-Nite. They were accidentally killed and devoured by a giant alien bug that Vartox brought to earth in order to impress Power Girl. In this version, Byrna uses a robotic suit of armor that is capable of creating snow. They're mentioned as "an old Wonder Woman foe", suggesting that their battles with Wonder Woman had occurred in the past. They were also mentioned as having worked with the Ice Pack, which did not exist in that continuity.

The New 52
In The New 52, Blue Snowman is first seen when appearing briefly after battling Wonder Woman and her ally Hessia alongside their robot minions.

DC Rebirth
After the events of DC Rebirth, Blue Snowman's origin is altered. At some point, Byrna Brilyant came into contact with Veronica Cale, who had equipped Brilyant with an Exo-Mecha suit. This suit enabled Brilyant to attack Washington D.C. with blue snow, though the suit was eventually destroyed by Wonder Woman which in turn rendered Brilyant comatose.

Later, Blue Snowman returned, wearing the post-Crisis version of the suit, ambushing Wonder Woman and Steve Trevor during their Valentine's Day date. Having encased both Wonder Woman's and Steve Trevor's arms in blue ice, the villain went to finish Steve off, at which point Wonder Woman knocked off Snowman's helmet. Steve was surprised to discover that Blue Snowman was a woman, but Byrna corrected that assumption  by coming out as gender-fluid. Wonder Woman decided to let Byrna leave, hoping that this new insight will bring them peace.

Two days before Christmas, Harley Quinn tracked the Blue Snowman down for help in curing Poison Ivy's mysterious viral infection. The pair sought out a mystical staff with healing properties which led them to the superhero Hawkman. Hawkman agreed to help the Blue Snowman and Harley Quinn after discovering they planned to use the staff to heal someone. After Poison Ivy was healed, she and Harley invited the Blue Snowman to stay with them for Christmas, as Byrna had mentioned how they hated the holiday due to their loneliness.

Powers and abilities
Blue Snowman possesses no superhuman powers, but has a genius-level intellect.

Equipment
Blue Snowman relies upon a "telescopic snow ray" to create petrifying blizzards and a "defroster ray" for reverse effects. They use a variety of gadgets, including a hat that produces blue snow and a smoking pipe that projects icicles.

Other versions

DC Super Friends
Blue Snowman appeared as a member of the Ice Pack with Mr. Freeze, Captain Cold, Minister Blizzard, Killer Frost, and Icicle in issue #16 of the Super Friends comic book series. Along with the Ice Pack, the group was able to freeze the Super Friends in a solid block of ice. Later, Blue Snowman argued with Killer Frost over the Selma Diamond, which resulted in the two encasing each other in ice and allowed Superman and Aquaman to take them into custody.

The All-New Batman: The Brave and the Bold
Blue Snowman appeared in the All-New Batman: The Brave and the Bold comic book series (which is based on the animated series of the same name). They were seen with the other Wonder Woman villains (consisting of Amoeba Man, Angle Man, Cheetah, Crimson Centipede, Fireworks Man, Giganta, Mouse Man, and Paper-Man) as they, along with an assortment of Batman's villains, crashed the wedding between Batman and Wonder Woman. They were swiftly defeated by the joint efforts of the Justice League and the Amazons of Themyscira.

The Legend of Wonder Woman
Blue Snowman was set to appear in the second volume to The Legend of Wonder Woman, a retelling of Wonder Woman's origins by Renae de Liz and Ray Dillon. However, DC cancelled the project under unknown circumstances. De Liz later posted preliminary artwork featuring Blue Snowman on Twitter.

Sensational Wonder Woman
In the digital-first anthology series Sensational Wonder Woman, Blue Snowman first appears in the story "Ice Blue", where they receive funding from Veronica Cale to enhance their blue snow technology. Blue Snowman later appears in "The Queen's Hive", where they, Giganta, Dr. Poison, and Silver Swan serve as Queen Bee's generals. The Blue Snowman later attacks a city but is stopped by Wonder Woman with the help of Will, one of her young fans. After the fight Wonder Woman suggests that Byrna might find better self satisfaction and respect if they used their talents to help others instead of bullying them.

Tales from Earth-6
Blue Snowman was re-imagined as "Frosteen" in this anthology special celebrating Stan Lee. In the story, Frosteen battled Maria Mendoza, the version of Wonder Woman that Lee created for DC's Just Imagine... line.

In other media

Video games
Blue Snowman appears as a boss in Justice League: Cosmic Chaos, voiced by Vanessa Marshall.

See also
 List of Wonder Woman enemies

References

External links
 The Unofficial Blue Snowman Biography

Comics characters introduced in 1946
Characters created by William Moulton Marston
DC Comics LGBT supervillains
DC Comics supervillains
Fictional humanoids
Fictional non-binary people
Wonder Woman characters
Golden Age supervillains
Fictional characters with ice or cold abilities
Fictional cross-dressers
Fictional snowmen